BioData Mining is a peer-reviewed open access scientific journal covering data mining methods applied to computational biology and medicine established in 2008. It is published by BioMed Central and the editors-in-chief are  Jason H. Moore and Marylyn D. Ritchie (University of Pennsylvania).

Abstracting and indexing
The journal is abstracted and indexed in:

According to the Journal Citation Reports, the journal has a 2021 impact factor of 4.079.

References

External links

BioMed Central academic journals
Biomedical informatics journals
Creative Commons Attribution-licensed journals
Publications established in 2008
Continuous journals